Japanese-Serbian relations are the bilateral relations between the countries of Japan and Serbia. Both countries have signed diplomatic missions on May 20, 1997. Japan has an embassy in Belgrade and subsequently, Serbia has an embassy in Tokyo and an honorary consulate in Osaka.

History
In the late 19th century, Japan had emerged from a small, weak island state to the Empire, while Serbia gained independence from the Ottoman Empire and established the Kingdom of Serbia. Through Russia, Serbia had started to set up relations with Japan. However, before 1914, both countries did not have any official relations.

World War I
At World War I, after the Serbian resistance regarding the Austro-Hungarian Army invading Serbia, Japan announced war on the Central Powers in late 1914. From here, Japan began to send aid, materials and supplies to Serbia through the Mediterranean Sea and Russia, growing the relationship between the two countries. Japan also opposed what they called "brutal occupation" by the Austrians and Bulgarians after they invaded Serbia in 1915. After then, Japan focused their actions mainly in Asia.

World War II
However, in World War II, Serbia now became the Kingdom of Yugoslavia. Japan had supported Germany and its ally, making the relationship between the two drop to the lowest point in its history. Yugoslav officials in Japan were expelled out of Japan, as Japan was a part of the Axis. From there, the struggling relations between Japan and Serbia started, with much hostility between both.

Until Japan's surrender at 1945, Japan and Serbia kept a negative view of each-other.

Yugoslavia–Japan relations

Josip Broz Tito assumed power after the collapse of the Kingdom and quickly restored back relations with Japan, which was now crumbling. Tito was seen as friendly and good with Japan, as Tito, unlike other Communist leaders, did not side with anyone at that time. Japan and Yugoslavia signed their first treaty of friendship in the late 1950s, and their relations until the collapse of Yugoslavia in 1991 were spectacular.

Modern Serbia-Japan relations
Despite having a long and quality relations with Serbia, Japan, however, also had supported the independence of the disputed territory of Kosovo.

Trade and aid
Japan is considered one of Serbia's most important trading partners in Asia. One of the most notable interactions between the two countries took place in 2003 when Japan donated 93 city buses to the city of Belgrade.

In late 2020 a foundation stone for a Japanese factory of tires was laid in Inđija, with the total investment being 382 million euros.

Japanese influence on Serbian life
There are a large amount of Serbian expats in Japan, most of them being football players who seek careers in Japan.

There are also references to Serbians in Japanese entertainment in areas such as anime and manga. For example, the character Irina Jelavić from Assassination Classroom is of Serbian descent. Even though Japan was an ally with Croatia and Bulgaria during World War II, many of Japanese citizens still regard Serbia as a major ally in the region. 

The famous Serbian slogan "Srbija do Tokija" also attracts many Japanese people on discovering Serbian history.

Miscellaneous
The most recent census data records 86 Japanese nationals living in Serbia.

In November 2003, the Japanese Commercial Forum in Serbia and Montenegro was founded.

See also

Foreign relations of Japan
Foreign relations of Serbia

Notes

References

External links
Japan-Serbia relations Ministry of foreign affairs of Japan: Japan-Serbia relations
Embassy of Japan in Belgrade, Serbia 
Embassy of Serbia in Tokyo, Japan 

 
Serbia
Bilateral relations of Serbia